This list includes properties and districts listed on the California Historical Landmark listing in Merced County, California. Click the "Map of all coordinates" link to the right to view a Google map of all properties and districts with latitude and longitude coordinates in the table below.

|}

References

See also

List of California Historical Landmarks
National Register of Historic Places listings in Merced County, California

 Historic Places|.
List of California Historical Landmarks
Geography of Merced County, California
Protected areas of Merced County, California
Merced County, California
History of the San Joaquin Valley